is a railway station in the city of Hirakawa, Aomori, Japan, operated by the private railway operator Kōnan Railway Company.

Lines

Station layout
Tachita Station has a one island platform. The station building is connected to the platform by a level crossing and is unattended.

Platforms

Adjacent stations

History
Tachita Station was opened on September 7, 1927. It became a kan'i itaku station in October 1974. Freight operations were discontinued in 1984. On August 28, 1987, an accident occurred at Tachita Station when a conductor started his train without waiting for the signal to turn, thus resulting in a head-on collision with an incoming train. The station has been unattended since April 2006.

Surrounding area
Tachita onsen

See also

 List of railway stations in Japan

External links
 
Location map 

Railway stations in Aomori Prefecture
Konan Railway
Hirakawa, Aomori
Railway stations in Japan opened in 1927